Shanghaied Love is a 1931 American Pre-Code drama film directed by George B. Seitz and starring Richard Cromwell, Sally Blane and Noah Beery.  It was produced and released by Columbia Pictures. The film's sets were designed by the art director Stephen Goosson. It is based on the 1922 novel The Blood Ship by Norman Springer, previously made into the 1927 silent film The Blood Ship.

Plot
The crew of the Black Yankee is mostly composed of men shanghaied from San Francisco but also includes Newman a disgraced former sea captain who has a past with the brutal commander of the ship Captain Swope.

Cast
 Richard Cromwell as The Boy
 Sally Blane as Mary Swope
 Noah Beery as Capt. 'Black Yankee' Angus Swope
 Willard Robertson as Newman
 Sidney Bracey as The Rat
 Richard Alexander as Eric
 Ed Brady as Fitzgibbons
 Erville Alderson as Deaken
 Jack Cheatham as Lynch
 Fred Toones as Snowflake
 Lionel Belmore as The Knitting Swede

See also
List of lost films

References

Bibliography
 Goble, Alan. The Complete Index to Literary Sources in Film. Walter de Gruyter, 1999.

External links

1931 films
American drama films
1931 drama films
Films directed by George B. Seitz
American black-and-white films
Lost American films
Columbia Pictures films
Seafaring films
Films set in San Francisco
Remakes of American films
Films based on American novels
1930s American films